Cameroon–Turkey relations are the foreign relations between Cameroon and Turkey.

Diplomatic relations 

Relations were initially tense between Turkey and Cameroon under President Ahidjo, who used the police and security apparatus to eliminate people who were perceived to be his enemies. Relations with Turkey improved considerably with Cameroon under Biya, who attempted to develop a freer and more democratic Cameroon with more freedom of speech and press. During this time, Turkey assisted Cameroon in building schools, which contributed to the fact that relative to many African countries, Cameroon has a much higher proportion of children in school. However, relations worsened after the crackdown on dissent following the 1984 coup attempt.

Following the decline in prices and demand in petroleum, Cameroon's economy which is highly dependent on export of petroleum, deteriorated rapidly. By 1987, Cameroon became a Heavily indebted poor countries, which allowed access to additional funds. Turkey  joined the IMF, the World Bank, and other aid-giving countries in providing economic assistance to Cameroon.

Economic relations 
 Trade volume between the two countries was 205 million USD in 2018 (Turkish exports/imports: 151/54 million USD).
 There are direct flights daily from Istanbul to Douala and Yaoundé.

Educational relations 
 Turkish Maarif Foundation runs schools in Cameroon.

See also 

 Foreign relations of Cameroon
 Foreign relations of Turkey

References

Further reading 
 Adams, Melinda. “‘National Machineries’ and Authoritarian Politics: The Case of Cameroon.” International Feminist Journal of Politics 9, no. 2 (June 2007): pp. 176–97. 
 Agyeman, Opoku. The Failure of Grassroots Pan-Africanism: The Case of the All-African Trade Union Federation. Lanham, Md.: Lexington Books, 2003. 
 Bansekam Cage. “The ‘Anti-gang’ Civil Militias in Cameroon.” In Civil Militia: Africa's Intractable Security Menace? ed. David J. Francis. Aldershot, UK: Ashgate, 2005. 
 Campbell, Craig. Blood Diamonds: Tracing the Deadly Path of the World's Most Precious Stones. Boulder, Colo.: Westview, 2004. 
 Chan, Stephen. Grasping Africa: A Tale of Achievement and Tragedy. New York: Palgrave Macmillan, 2007. 
 Cutter, Charles H. Africa: The World Today Series. 42nd ed. Harpers Ferry, W.V.: Stryker-Post, 2007. 
 Delancey, Mark W. “Ahmadou Ahidjo.” In Political Leaders of Contemporary Africa, ed. Harvey Glickman. Westport, CT: Greenwood, 1992. 
 Dixon, Wheeler Winston, and Gwendolyn Audrey Foster. A Short History of Film. New Brunswick, N.J.: Rutgers University Press, 2008. 
 Duignan, Peter, and Lewis H. Gann. Africa and the World. Lanham, Md.: Rowman & Littlefield, 1972. 
 Fanso, Verkijika G. “Traditional and Colonial African Boundaries: Concepts and Functions in Inter-Group Relations.” Présence Africaine 137–138 (1986): pp. 58–75. 
 Fonkeng, George Epah. The History of Education in Cameroon, 1844–2004. Lewiston, NY: Edwin Mellen Press, 2007. 
 French, Howard W. A Continent for the Taking: The Tragedy and Hope of Africa. New York: Alfred A. Knopf, 2004. 
 Geschiere, Peter, and Piet Konings, eds. Conference on the Political Economy of Cameroon—Historical Perspectives, Leiden, June 1988. Leiden, Netherlands: African Studies Centre, 1989. 
 Gros, Jean-Germaine, ed. Cameroon: Politics and Society in Critical Perspectives. Lanham, MD: University Press of America, 2003. 
 Ngoh, Victor J. Cameroon 1884–1985. Yaoundé, Cameroon: Navi, 1988. 
 Nkarey, Jules Sansterre. Afrique: L’histoire entre le Cameroun anglophone et le Cameroun francophone, de 1472 à 2003. Paris: Publibook, 2006.
 Nugent, Paul. Africa since Independence: A Comparative History. New York: Palgrave Macmillan, 2004. 
 Tumi, Cardinal Christian Wiyghansai Shaagham. The Political Regime of Ahmadou Ahidjo and Paul Biya, and Christian Tumi, Priest. Douala, Cameroon: MACACOS S.A., 2006. 
 Schwab, Peter. Africa: A Continent Self-Destructs. New York: Palgrave Macmillan, 2002.
 Wright, Stephen. African Foreign Policies. Boulder, Colo.: Westview, 1998.

Cameroon–Turkey relations
Turkey
Bilateral relations of Turkey